
0-9 A B C D E F

0-9
 2-step garage – a chaotic style of UK garage.
 20th-century classical music – loose term for orchestral music made during or after the 20th century
 4-beat – a breakbeat hardcore style played between 150 and 170 BPM consisting of a fast looped breakbeat and a drum at every 4 beats.

A
Aa-Ak – Al-An – Ap-Ax

 A cappella – a style of music  performed without any background music/instruments and just voices doing the instrumentation.
 Absolute music – music that is not explicitly "about" anything.
 Acid house – a psychedelic style of house music, defined primarily by the deep basslines and "squelching" sounds of the Roland TB-303 electronic synthesizer-sequencer.
 Acid jazz –  a psychedelic music genre that combines elements of jazz, soul music, funk, and disco.
 Acid rock – a harder style of psychedelic rock, characterized with long instrumental solos, few (if any) lyrics and musical improvisation.
 Acid techno – a style of techno that developed out of acid house.
 Acid trance – a psychedelic style of trance music.
 Acousmatic music – a style of electroacoustic music that is specifically composed for presentation using speakers, as opposed to a live performance.
 Acoustic music – a music that solely or primarily uses instruments which produce sound through entirely acoustic means, as opposed to electric or electronic means.
 Adult contemporary music – any music with lush and soothing qualities that focuses on melody and harmony.
 African-American music – any music made by African-Americans. 
 African heavy metal – heavy metal music performed by African musicians.
 African hip hop – hip hop music performed by African musicians.
 Afrobeat – a large-scaled and energetic combination of funk and jazz.
Afrobeats - umbrella term for West African pop styles
 Afro-Cuban jazz – style of jazz influenced by traditional Afro-Cuban music.
Afroswing -  a genre of music that developed in the UK during the mid-2010s, derivative of dancehall and afrobeats, with influences from trap, hip hop, R&B, and grime.
 African popular music – pop music informed by traditional African styles.
 Aguinaldo – traditional Latin American Christmas music.

Al-An
 Aleatoric music – music the composition of which is partially left to chance.
 Alternative country – any style of country music that deviates from the normal, usually by incorporating elements found in alternative rock (particularly its personal lyrics).
 Alternative dance – a fusion of alternative rock and post-disco; usually contains alternative rock song structures and post-disco beats.
 Alternative hip hop – any style of hip hop music that deviates from the norm, usually by possessing lyrics not usually found in mainstream hip hop as well as musically combining it with other genres; despite its popularity among alternative rock fans, only some alternative rappers actually fuse hip hop with that genre.
 Alternative metal – any style of heavy metal music that deviates from the norm, usually by incorporating elements found in alternative rock (particularly its melodic vocals). Many alternative metal bands also tend to either have funk or hip hop music influences.
 Alternative R&B – any style of contemporary R&B that deviates from the norm, usually by having a more electronic influence. Originally a synonymous term for neo soul, alternative R&B (which now only refers to styles originating from the 2000s), alternative R&B tries to expand beyond the conventions of genres altogether.
 Alternative reggaeton – any style of reggaeton that deviates from the norm.
 Alternative rock – any style of rock music deviates from the norm, usually by having melodic vocals and personal lyrics; often applied to styles that sprang out following the initial punk rock music scene.
 Ambient music – a style of incredibly slow electronic music that uses long repetitive sounds to generate a sense of calm and atmosphere.
 Ambient house – a style of house music that contains the atmospheric musical textures of ambient music.
 Ambient pop – a style of dream pop with heavy ambient influence that developed in the 1980s.
 Ambient techno – a fusion of techno and ambient music.
 Ambrosian chant – plainsong used during the Ambrosian rite.
 American folk music – folk music developed in the United States.
 American folk-music revival – a musical revival of American folk music that occurred from the 1940s through the 1960s, resulting in contemporary folk music.
 Americana – music that invokes the musical ethos of the United States (i.e.  roots rock).
 Anarcho-punk – punk rock with anarchist themes.
 Ancient music – music created in the early stages of literate cultures.
 Anglican chant – plainsong used by Anglican church.
 Anatolian rock – a style of folk rock that fuses Turkish folk music with rock music.
 Anti-folk – a mocking style of folk that subverts the earnest, politically-informed lyrics of folk-revivalists.

Ap-Ax
 Apala – Nigerian music originally used by the Yoruba people to wake worshippers after fasting during Ramadan.
 Appalachian music – American folk music originated from the Appalachia region that later became the basis for old-time music and country music.
 Arabesque – an Arabic style of music created in Turkey.
 Arabic pop music – pop music informed by traditional Arabic styles.
 Arena rock – any style of rock music inherently designed for large audiences (i.e. an arena); largely used as a pejorative label than as a description for an actual genre of rock.
 Argentine rock – rock music performed by Argentinian musicians.
 Armenian chant – chants used in the liturgy of the Armenian Apostolic Church.
 Ars antiqua – European music from the Late Middle Ages, which advanced concepts of rhythm.
 Ars nova – style of French music from the Late Middle Ages, rejected fiercely by the Catholic Church.
 Ars subtilior – style of French music from the Late Middle Ages.
 Art pop – pop music made purposefully to bring the genre to artistic heights. 
 Art punk – punk rock made purposefully to bring the genre to artistic heights; sometimes considered a style of post-punk.
 Art rock – rock music made purposefully to bring the genre to artistic heights.
 Ashik – music performed by mystic or traveling Turkish, Azerbaijan, Georgian, Armenian, and Iranian bands, using vocals and the saz, performed since ancient times.
 Assyrian folk/pop music – pop, folk and dance music informed by traditional Assyrian styles.
 Australian country music – country music performed by Australian musicians.
 Australian hip hop – hip hop music performed by Australian musicians.
 Avant-funk – an avant-garde style of funk made purposefully to challenge the conventions of the genre.
 Avant-garde music – music considered to be ahead of its time, often using new, unusual, or experimental elements, or fusing pre-existing genres.
 Avant-garde jazz – an avant-garde style of jazz made purposefully to challenge the conventions of the genre; related and originally synonymous with free jazz, avant-garde jazz still maintains some form of structure and uses composed melodies.
 Avant-garde metal – an avant-garde style of heavy metal music made purposefully to challenge the conventions of the genre.
 Avant-pop – any avant-garde form of popular music that is experimental, new, and distinct from previous styles while retaining an immediate accessibility for the listener. 
 Avant-prog – a style that appeared in the late 1970s as the extension of progressive rock, chiefly by being a fusion of its two subgenres: Rock in Opposition and the Canterbury scene.
 Avant-punk – punk rock made purposefully to challenge the conventions of the genre.
 Axé – a style of Salvadorian, Bahian, and Brazilian music informed by Afro-Cuban and Afro-Brazilian styles.
 Azonto – a dance and music genre from Ghana.

B
Bac-Bal – Bam-Bay – Be-Bh – Bi-Bl – Br-Bu

Bac-Bal
 Bachata – An Afro-Dominican style waltz, consisting of despairing and romantic ballads, popular among Dominican artists.
 Baggy – the main music style of the Madchester scene that incorporates the psychedelic elements of acid house (particularly its deep bassline) into alternative rock.
 Baião – a Brazilian rhythmic formula built around the zabumba drum that later combined itself with elements of mestizo, European, and African styles.
 Bakersfield sound – a raw and gritty country music style significantly influenced by rock and roll that acted as a reaction against the slick, overproduced Nashville sound.
 Baila – a Sri Lankan style that begun among the Afro-Sinhalese (or Kariff) community.
 Baisha xiyue – an orchestral Chinese style used by the Naxi people that is often found in Taoist or Confucian ceremonies.
 Bajourou – initially an acoustic style of Malian pop music played at gatherings (particularly weddings), which has since become mostly electronic.
 Bal-musette – 19th century style of French accordion-based dance music.
 Balakadri – Guadeloupean music made from the quadrille, usually performed at balls
 Balinese Gamelan – Javanese and Balinese style made from xylophones, drums, and plucked strings
 Balearic beat – a style of house music that originated from the Balearic Islands.
 Balkan brass – a Serbian music style made by soldiers that combined military brass with folk music.
 Ballad – usually slow, romantic, despairing and catastrophic songs.
 Ballata – 13th–15th century Italian musical and poetic form based on an AbbaA structure that acted as a form of dance music
 Ballet – specific style of French classical music created to accompany the ballet dance
 Baltimore club – a music style originated from Baltimore that combines hip hop music, breakbeat, house music.

Bam-Bay
 Bambuco – a Colombian music style based on waltz and polska.
 Banda music – brass-based Mexican music.
 Bangsawan – a style of Malay opera based on Indian styles introduced by immigrants.
 Bantowbol – a Cameroonian style of accordion music.
 Barbershop music – a style of a capella close harmony vocal music that is generally performed in quartets.
 Barcarolle – a traditional music style from Italy sung by Venetian gondoliers.
 Bard (Soviet Union) – a style of Russian music made by singer-songwriters during the latter half of the Soviet era.
 Barn dance – folk music played in a barnhouse.
 Baroque music – a style of Western art music made between the 17th and 18th centuries characterized by its usage of the harpsichord and contrapuntal melodies.
 Baroque pop – a style of rock music originating from the 1960s that contains elements of Baroque music (particularly its instrumentation and contrapuntal melodies). As Baroque pop is usually not seen as being a pop music genre, it is sometimes refer to as baroque rock.
 Barynya – Russian folk music style.
 Bassline – style of speed garage that combines elements of dubstep, particularly its emphasis on bass
 Batá-rumba – Cuban rumba music that incorporates bata and guaguanco
 Batucada – an African-influenced style of Brazilian samba
 Baul – A style of folk music, specially in Bengali region.

Be-Bh
 Beach music – Californian genre from the 1950s that combined elements of all popular genres at the time, particularly big band and shag jazz
 Beat music – a style of rock and roll developed in the United Kingdom characterized by its strong, driving beat that emphasize all the beats of a 4/4 bar; unlike British rock and roll, beat music was seen as being musically on par with American rock and roll and was able to found success in the United States following the British Invasion.
 Beatboxing – a capella music created to emulate hip hop beats
 Beatlesque – artists who musically resemble the Beatles, such as Electric Light Orchestra, Oasis, and many power pop bands.
 Beautiful music – term of endearment for various easy listening genres
 Bebop – a fast-paced style of jazz popular in the 1940s and 1950s that replaced the dance-oriented swing music; known for its complex chord progressions, instrumental virtuosity, and the predominant role of the rhythm section.
 Beguine/Biguine Music style from French territory in the caribbean, Martinique island and precursor of jazz
 Beiguan music – style of Chinese traditional music popular in Taiwan and the province of Zhangzhou
 Bel canto – a light, sophisticated style of Italian opera singing
 Bend-skin – urban Cameroonian music
 Beneventan chant – plainsong originated from Benevento.
 Benga music – Kenyan popular music based on Luo and Kikuyu folk music
 Bent edge
 Berlin School of electronic music – heavily experimental electronic music that acted as a more avant-garde style of Krautrock and inspired ambient and New Age music
 Bhajan – Hindu religious music
 Bhangra – a popular style of Punjabi dance music that uses western instruments along with traditional Punjabi instruments; named after the dance of the same name.
 Bhangragga – a fusion of bhangra, reggae and dancehall

Bi-Bo
 Big band music – large orchestras which play a style of swing music
 Big beat – a 1990s style of breakbeat that incorporates elements found in acid house (specifically its synthesizer basslines).
 Big room house
 Biguine – Guadeloupean folk music
 Bihu – A popular folk music of Assam, India
 Biker metal
 Biomusic – a style of experimental music which deals with sounds created or performed by living things.
 Bitpop – electronic music, where at least part of the music is made using old 8-bit computers, game consoles and little toy instruments. Popular choices are the Commodore 64, Game Boy, Atari 2600 and Nintendo Entertainment System.
 Blackened death metal – a fusion between death and black metal
 Black metal – an extreme metal style known for its lo-fi recording, shrieking vocals, unconventional song structures and dark or supernatural lyrics.
 Blackgaze – a fusion style between black metal and shoegazing.
 Black MIDI – sheet music consisting in huge amount of notes per instrument, generally written in digital MIDI format.
 Bluegrass music – a style of country music mixed with Irish/Scottish (via old-time music), and African-American (via blues and jazz) influences.
 Blue-eyed soul – soul music performed by white musicians.
 Blues – a style from the Mississippi Delta area known for its usually depressing lyrics and its unique song structure, using playing techniques such as blue notes, blues scales, and the twelve-bar chord progression.
 Blues ballad – fusion of blues and folk
 Blues rock – a fusion of blues (specifically electric blues) and rock music; usually contains blues song structures and rock instrumentation.
 Bongo Flava – East African Hip-Hop
 Boogie – 1. a repetitive form of rhythm found in boogie-woogie. 2. a style of funk characterized by a mid-tempo post-disco rhythm, prominent use of slap bass, loud clapping sound, and its new wave melodic chords and synthesizers.
 Boogie rock – a style of blues rock that fuses rock music with boogie-woogie.
 Boogie-woogie – a danceable style of the blues centered on a specific form of rhythm called boogie.
 Boogaloo – a fusion of soul music and mambo.
 Boi – Amazonian folk music
 Bollywood songs
 Bosnian root music – Bosnian rural roots music
 Bossa Nova – a well-known style of Brazilian music, a lyrical fusion of samba and jazz.
 Bothy Ballad - Folk songs, sung and popularised within the farm workers in the Northeast of Scotland.
 Bounce music – energetic hip-hop music, native to New Orleans, frequently characterized by chromatic tics and "call and response" lyrics
 Bouncy techno – an upbeat style of electronic dance music.

Br-Bu
 Brass – music performed with brass instruments, prior to the advent of jazz
 Breakbeat – a style of electronic dance music built on previously recorded breaks. 
 Breakbeat hardcore – a fusion of breakbeat and acid house
 Breakcore – a fast and frantic style of breakbeat influenced by hardcore and industrial music that is known for its intentionally diverse range of samples.
 Breakstep
 Brega genre of Brazilian popular music
 Breton – folk music of Brittany, France, known for its use of woodwind
 Brill Building Sound – a distinct style of pop music developed in the Brill Building using Tin Pan Alley songwriting.
 Brit funk – funk performed by British musicians, often influenced by soul, jazz, and Caribbean music
 Britpop – British alternative rock from the 1990s that subverted the depressing themes of the then-popular grunge movement in favor of jangly, optimistic music with lyrics often touching on the themes of partying and working class life. Despite its name, it is rarely viewed as a style of pop music.
 British blues – a style of electric blues developed by British musicians.
 British folk rock – associated with the folk revival of the 1960s, British folk rock tends to use modern, often electric, instruments alongside or in place of traditional and acoustic folk instruments
 British Invasion – refers to a period where British musicians, primarily of the beat music movement along with some pop acts, became popular in America during the 1960s.
 British hip hop – hip hop music originating from the United Kingdom.
 British rhythm and blues – rhythm and blues (as in the blues style) originating from the United Kingdom; usually more guitar driven than its original form.
 British rock music – rock music originating from the United Kingdom.
 British rock and roll – rock and roll originating from the United Kingdom; commonly viewed as being an inferior version of its original counterpart, its popularity was almost completely replaced by the much more lively beat music.
 Broken beat – a style of breakbeat played in a syncopated 4/4 rhythm with punctuated snare beats.
 Brostep – an aggressive and metal-influenced style of dubstep popular in America
 Brown-eyed soul – soul music performed by Latinos.
 Brukdown – Belizean music inspired by European harmonies, African rhythms, and the call-and-response format
 Bubblegum pop – pop music known for its simplicity, happy and cute lyrics, and emphasis on image rather than substance.
 Buddhist music
 Bullerengue – style of Colombian music with African rithms and chants.
 Bikutsi – Cameroonian EDM, originating in the Beti community
 Bulerías – fast-paced flamenco music
 Bunraku – Japanese folk music often played at puppet theaters
 Burger-highlife – style of highlife played by Ghanaian-Germans
 Burgundian School – group of French, Belgian, and Dutch composers active in the 15th century, known for their secular forms
 Bush ballad – Australian folk music often dealing with themes of Australian spirit and rebellion
 Byzantine music – Greek music performed during the age of the Byzantine Empire; known for its ecclesiastical form (i.e. chants).

C
Ca – Ce – Cha – Che-Chi – Cho-Chr – Chu – Ci-Cl – Col-Cor – Cou-Cow – Cr-Cu

Ca
 Ca din tulnic – Romanian folk music played with the alpenhorn
 Ca trù – a style of Vietnamese chamber music performed by one lute player and a geisha-esque female singer, used to entertain wealthy audiences, who would be included in the performances, and to perform in religious ceremonies
 Cabaret – an often jazz-informed style of music played at upbeat stageplays or burlesque shows
 Cadence-lypso – fusion of kadans and calypso
 Cadence rampa – upbeat style of kadans
 Cải lương – modern Vietnamese folk opera
 Cajun music – a style of American folk music developed by the Cajun people of Louisiana.
 Cakewalk
 Calinda – Trinidadian folk music played during practices of the martial art of the same name
 Čalgija – Macedonian folk style
 Calypso music – a Trinidadian popular music genre inspired by both African (via Kaiso) and French styles and is known for its lyrics dealing with the racist oppression of native Trinidadians at the time.
 Calypso-style baila – fusion of baila and calypso
 Campursari – Indonesian fusion genre, combining several folk styles with pop music
 Can Can
 Canadian blues – blues performed by Canadians.
 Candombe – fusion of African and Uruguayan styles developed by African-Uruguayan slaves in the 19th century
 Canon – any music that combines a melody with copies of itself
 Cantata – any music sung by a choir with instrumental backing
 Cante chico – the vocal component to flamenco music
 Cante jondo – flamenco music that incorporates deep vocals
 Canterbury scene – group of British avant-garde, progressive rock, and jazz fusion musicians based in the English city of Canterbury, Kent
 Cantiñas – upbeat style of Andalusian flamenco music
 Cantiga – Portuguese ballad style from the Middle Ages
 Canto livre – Portuguese folk music known for its far-left political messages
 Cantopop – any Chinese pop music sung in Cantonese
 Cantu a tenore – Sardinian style of polyphonic folk singing
 Canzone Napoletana – Italian music sung in Neapolitan
 Cape Breton fiddling – a Celtic-style of fiddle playing.
 Capoeira music – Brazilian music played during performances of the martial art of the same name
 Carimbó Music and dance from the north east of Brazil 
 Cariso – Trinidadian folk music, often considered an early form of calypso
 Carnatic music – southern Indian classical music
 Carol – a festive song, often sung on Christmas or, rarely, Easter
 Cartageneras – a style of flamenco known for its focus on folklore
 Carnavalito
 Cavacha – style of rhythm popular in Kenyan and Zairean music

Ce
 Celempungan – Sudanese folk music
 Cello rock – rock music that incorporates cellos
 Celtic chant – a style of Christian liturgy chant developed in Britain, Ireland and Brittany.
 Celtic fusion – any fusion that includes a Celtic music influence.
 Celtic metal – a style of folk metal/Celtic fusion that fuses Celtic music and heavy metal music.
 Celtic music – any music (usually folk music) of the Celts.
 Celtic punk – a Celtic fusion of Celtic music and punk rock.
 Celtic reggae – fusion of Celtic and reggae music
 Celtic rock – a Celtic fusion of Celtic music and folk rock.

Cha
 Cha-cha-cha – Cuban folk music
 Chacarera – Argentinian folk and dance music
 Chakacha – music of the Swahili people of Kenya and Tanzania
 Chalga – fusion of Bulgarian etno-pop and dance music with Eastern and Arab elements, popular in Southern Bulgaria
 Chamamé – style of Argentinian, Paraguayan, Mesopotamian, and Brazilian folk music
 Chamarrita – style of Argentinian and Uruguayan folk music
 Chamber music – classical music performed for a small audience by a small orchestra
 Chamber jazz – fusion of chamber and jazz music
 Chamber pop – a style of indie pop that incorporates elements of orchestral pop (particularly its usage of an orchestra) in order to recreate the sounds of baroque pop.
 Champeta – African-Colombian folk music
 Changüí – Cuban music that fused African and Spanish styles
 Chanson – French vocal-driven music
 Chant – singing or speaking rhythmically to a very small number of pitches.
 Chap hop – a variety of music originating from England that mixes the hip hop genre with elements from the Chappist or steampunk subcultures
 Charanga – traditional Cuban dance music
 Charanga-vallenata – fusion of charanga, vallenata, and salsa
 Charikawi – music accompanying of the dance of the same name of the Garifuna people
 Charleston (dance)
 Chastushka – humorous and fast-paced Russian and Ukrainian folk music
 Chầu văn – a downtempo, trance-inducing style of Vietnamese folk music

Che-Chi
 Chèo – a style of musical theater performed by Vietnamese peasants
 Chicano rock – rock music (often either a form of rock and roll or a style of Latin rock) performed by Mexican-Americans. May or not be considered a form of rock en español, depending on whether the lyrics are sung in English or in Spanish.
 Children's music – any music (mostly folk music) marketed towards children.
 Chicago blues – blues performed by Chicago inhabitants; considered the first form of electric blues.
 Chicago house – house music performed by Chicago inhabitants; considered the first form of house music.
 Chicago soul – soul music performed by Chicago inhabitants
 Chicken scratch – fusion of Native American, White American, Mexican, and European styles, performed by the Native American Tohono O'odham people
 Chill-out music – any music with a slow tempo designed to calm people after raves; originally a synonymous term for ambient house.
 Chillwave – indie pop style known for its looped synths and calming effects
 Chinese music – any music performed by Chinese people
 Chinese rock – rock music performed by Chinese people, often fused with traditional styles
 Chiptune – Electronic music that is made on vintage computers/game systems or emulations thereof. May also refer to electronic music that uses samples from video games or vintage computers.

Cho-Chr
 Chouval bwa – Martinican folk music
 Chowtal – north Indian folk music performed during the Phagwa or Holi festival
 Choro – fast-paced Brazilian pop music
 Christmas carol – carols performed during the Christmas season
 Christmas music – any music tied to the Christmas season
 Christian alternative rock – alternative rock with Christian themes.
 Christian country music – fusion of Christian and country music
 Christian hardcore – fusion of Christian and hardcore punk rock
 Christian hip hop – hip hop with Christian themes
 Christian metal – fusion of Christian and heavy metal rock
 Christian music – music with overt Christian themes.
 Christian punk – fusion of Christian and punk rock
 Christian rock – rock music with Christian themes
 Christian ska – ska music with Christian themes
 Chylandyk – style of throat singing performed by the Tuva people of Siberia, created to mimic the chirps of crickets

Chu
 Chula – dance and music genre which originated in Portugal,
 Chumba – folk and dance style of the Garifuna people of west Africa
 Church music
 Chut-kai-pang – fusion of chutney, calypso, and parang
 Chutney music – Caribbean pop music that fuses calypso and cadence with several Indian styles
 Chutney Soca – fusion of chutney and soca music

Ci-Cl
 Cifra
 Circus music – music made to accompany a circus.
 Classic country – mainstream country and western music hits from past decades.
 Classic rock - Rock music that begins in the 1950s and ends in the 2000s.
 Classic female blues – an early, vaudeville style of blues performed by female vocalists.
 Classical music – Western art music known for its use of large orchestras and staff notation.
 Classical period – a clearer, slicker style of Western art music performed in the 18th and 19th centuries, known for its emphasis on homophones and melody
 Close harmony – any music with notes performed in a close range

Col-Cor
 Coladeira – Cape Verdean folk music
 Coldwave – French post-punk
 College rock – a radio format made by and made for college students that centers on alternative rock.
 Combined rhythm – Dutch Antillean folk music inspired by zouk, merengue, and soca
 Comedy music – any music that incorporates heavy themes of humor and comedy.
 Comedy rap – fusion of comedy and hip hop music
 Comedy rock – a comedic form of rock music
 Comic opera – fusion of comedy and opera music
 Compas – a modernized style of Haitian meringue music
 Concerto – a three-part classical piece in which one instrument takes lead and is backed by an orchestra
 Concerto grosso – a style of baroque concerto in which the soloists and orchestra alternate playing
 Conga – Cuban music played to accompany the dance of the same name
 Conjunto – fusion of Mexican and German styles developed by Mexican-Americans who had bought German instruments in Texas
 Contemporary Christian music – pop music with overt Christian themes
 Conscious hip hop – a style of hip hop music that's, while not directly political like its successor genre political hip hop, still talks about the struggles within the African-American community.
 Contemporary folk music – a modern style of Western folk music that sprang out of the American folk-music revival.
 Contemporary laïka – modernized and pop-informed style of laïka
 Contemporary R&B – a modern style of rhythm and blues (as in the catch-all term for African-American popular music) that usually has an overall hip hop/pop production style, electronic-backed rhythms, pitch corrected vocals, and a smooth, lush style of vocal arrangement that heavily uses the melisma singing technique.
 Contradanza – 19th century Cuban dance music
 Cool jazz – a relaxed, downtempo style of jazz heavily inspired by classical music, that existed as a reaction to the fast-paced bebop
 Coon song – music about black stereotypes
 Coptic music – music (usually chants) performed within the Coptic Orthodox Church; usually contains elements of local Egyptian music.
 Corrido – Mexican storytelling ballad

Cou-Cow
 Country music – an American popular music genre originating from rural America with lyrics about the hardships of that culture that is played with acoustic guitars, steel guitars, banjos, fiddles, and harmonicas.
 Country blues – a rural, acoustic version of blues. As this style predates the existence of country music and only has lyrical similarities to that genre, it was renamed folk blues during the American folk-music revival.
 Country folk – fusion of country and folk music
 Country pop – fusion of country and pop music
 Country rap – fusion of country and hip hop music
 Country rock – a style of roots rock that incorporates elements of country music, particularly its lyrics and usage of the steel guitar.
 Coupé-Décalé – Ivorian-French EDM drawing on zouk and African influences
 Cowpunk – fusion of country and punk rock music

Cr-Cu
 Crabcore
 Creole music – folk music developed by the Louisiana Creole people.
 Cretan – Greek folk music performed by inhabitants of the island of Crete
 Crossover thrash – fusion of thrash metal and hardcore punk
 Crunk – known for its heavy basslines and shouted, call-and-response vocals
 Crunkcore – fusion of crunk and screamo
 Crust punk – fusion of anarcho- and hardcore punk and extreme metal
 Csárdás – Hungarian folk music
 Cuarteto – Argentinian merengue music, originating in the city of Cordoba, and influenced also by Spanish and Italian styles
 Cueca – Argentinian, Chilean, and Bolivian styles
 Cumbia – fusion of Colombian folk music and African and Spanish styles bought from slaves and colonists, respectively
 Cumbia villera – cumbia performed by inhabitants of the shantytowns of Buenos Aires
 Currulao
 Cyber Metal
 Czech bluegrass – Bluegrass music performed by Czech musicians.

D
Da – De-Dh – Di-Dr – Du

Da
 Dabke – Arabic folk dance music, often played at weddings
 Dadra – light vocal style of Hindustani classical music, originating from the Bundelkhand region
 Daina – Latvian folk music
 Daina – Lithuanian folk music
 Dance music – any music designed to make the listener dance. 
 Dance-pop – a danceable style of pop music that contains post-disco rhythms.
 Dance-punk – a danceable style of post-punk and a form of electronic rock that contains disco rhythms.
 Dance-rock – a fusion of post-disco and post-punk; usually contains post-punk instrumentation and post-disco rhythms.
 Dancehall – Jamaican pop music that abandons reggae's roots influences for a slicker, EDM-inspired production
 Dangdut – melodic and heavily optimistic style of Indonesian pop
 Danger music – any music that will, somehow, potentially harm either the performers or the audience, linked heavily to noise rock
 Dansband – Swedish folk music
 Danza – Puerto Rican style of music that accompanies the ballroom-influenced dance of the same name
 Danzón – Cuban dance music
 Dappan koothu – Indian folk dance music, popular in the states of Karnataka and Tamil Nadu, often used as filmi music in the movies produced in those states
 Dark ambient – a style of industrial music that takes elements from ambient music to create a feeling of dread and foreboding, rather than the relaxation given off by most ambient music.
 Dark cabaret – fusion of cabaret and gothic rock
 Darkcore – chaotic and sinister style of jungle, which relied on pitch-shifting and horror movie audio samples
 Darkstep – style of darkcore jungle that takes its signature sinister feel and fuses it with upbeat breakbeats and ambient noises, creating an excessively chaotic tone
 Dark wave – excessively pessimistic style of post-punk, which relied on tales of realistic sorrow, rather than the fantasy elements of the then-popular gothic rock

De-Dh
 De dragoste – Romanian love music
 Deathcore – fusion of death metal and metalcore
 Deathgrind – fusion of death metal and grindcore
 Death industrial – fusion of death and industrial metal, linked heavily to the power electronics scene
 Death metal – Extreme metal known for its distorted guitar structure, growling vocals, blast beat drumming and dark or violent lyrics.
 Death-doom – fusion of death and doom metal
 Death rock – style of gothic rock known for its scratchy guitars, and lyrics focusing on supernatural and pessimistic themes, sometimes delving into intentionally campy horror themes
 Décima – Hispanic genre of sung poetry
 Delta blues – blues performed by inhabitants of the Mississippi Delta; considered the first form of blues.
 Deep funk
 Deep house – style of Chicago house, inspired by jazz and soul music
 Descarga – a genre of improvised Afro-Cuban music
 Desi – a style of Hindustani classical raga, associated with the Asavari and Kafi thaat
 Detroit blues – blues music performed by inhabitants of Detroit, Michigan.
 Detroit techno – techno performed by inhabitants of Detroit, Michigan, USA
 Dhamar – a tala used in Hindustani classical music, associated with the dhrupad style, and played on a pakhawaj
 Dhrupad – vocal style of Hindustani classical music, considered the oldest still being performed today
 Dhun – a light instrumental style of Hindustani classical music

Di-Dr
 Diablada – Telluric Bolivian folk music style.
 Digital hardcore – fusion of hardcore punk and hardcore techno, known for its far-left lyrics
 Dirge – a song of mourning, often played at a funeral
 Dirty rap – hip hop with sexual and pornographic themes
 Disco – a style of dance music with elements of soul music, pop music and salsa music that was originated from music venues that were popular with African Americans, Latino Americans, Italian Americans, LGBT people, and psychedelic hippies.
 Disco polo – Polish disco music
 Diva house – style of house popular in LGBT nightclubs
 Dixieland – an early, possibly the first, style of jazz developed in New Orleans.
 Djent – style of progressive metal known for its elastic power chords
 Doina – Romanian folk music, informed by Middle Eastern styles
 Dolewave – a style of alternative rock developed in Melbourne, Australia during the 2010s.
 Dondang Sayang – love ballads from the Malaysian state of Malacca, influenced by Portuguese styles
 Donegal fiddle tradition – an Irish style of fiddle-playing from the Donegal county
 Dongjing – Chinese traditional music of Nakhi people of the Yunnan province
 Doo-wop – a simplistic style of music known for its vocal harmonies and usually slow and smooth upbeat instrumentation
 Doom metal – A style of heavy metal known for its low-tuned sound, slow tempos, clean and non-growled vocals and pessimistic lyrics
 Downtempo – a slow-paced style of electronic music that differs from ambient music in that it also has a beat and rhythm. Sometimes treated as a synonym for trip hop, it differs from that genre by having a less "earthy" sound.
 Dream pop – an atmospheric and melodic style of neo-psychedelia designed to make the audience feel dreamy; despite its name, it is usually not consider a form of pop music.
 Drone metal – fusion of drone and heavy metal music
 Drill music – Chicago rap, see Drill (music genre) for more
 Drone music – an experimental, minimalist style of ambient music, known for drawn-out and repetitive tones, giving it a droning feel.
 Drum and bass – a jungle-derived style of electronic dance music known for rapid-fire breakbeats and heavy basslines.
 Drumstep – fusion of drum and bass and dubstep

Du
 Dub music – an electronic offshoot of reggae in which pre-existing recordings (usually the instrumental track of said recordings called riddim) are heavily remixed, resulting in an echoey, reverberating sound.
 Dub techno – fusion of dub and techno
 Dubtronica – fusion of dub and EDM
 Dubstep – a style of music that is known for its sparse, heavy basslines and dub-inspired reverberating drums.
 Dubstyle – fusion of dubstep and hardstyle
 Dungeon synth – an electronic genre fusing black metal and dark ambient
 Dunun – family of west African drums
 Dunedin Sound – a style of indie pop based in Dunedin, New Zealand.
 Dutch jazz – jazz performed by Dutch musicians

E
Ea-En – Er-Ex

Ea-Ep
 Early music – any music made from the prehistoric era until the advent of baroque music
 East Coast hip hop – hip hop music originating from the American East Coast (largely New York City); considered the first form of hip hop music.
 Easy listening – a popular music genre and radio format known for its slower tempo and the large prominence of strings.
 Electric blues – any style of blues played with electric instruments, most notably the electric guitar.
 Electro – a style of boogie which intentionally sound robotic and computer-like that later incorporated the rhythms of hip hop music.
 Electro backbeat – any EDM which utilizes a 4/4 drum pattern
 Electrogrind – fusion of grindcore and industrial
 Electro house
 Electro-industrial – a style of post-industrial which used heavily produced and layered synths
 Electro swing – fusion of EDM and swing-jazz
 Electroacoustic music
 Electroclash – fusion of 1980s synthpop and 1990s techno
 Electronic body music – EDM-informed style of post-industrial
 Electronic dance music – EDM; any style of electronic music that is largely designed to be dance to. 
 Electronic music – music that utilizes electronic instruments, such as the synthesizer, Theremin, and computer.
 Electronic rock – refers to any style of rock music that contains elements of electronic music (usually its usage of the synthesizer), although the term is largely limited to certain styles.
 Electronica –  type of music that is produced using electrical instruments such as synthesizers, electronic percussion
 Electronicore – fusion of electronic and post-hardcore/metalcore music
 Electropop – a style of synth-pop that leans more towards the electronic music side than the pop music side.
 Electropunk – fusion of electronic and punk music
 Emo – heavily emotional and pessimistic style of post-hardcore, as well as indie rock in its subsequent form.
 Emo hip hop – a fusion of emo and indie rock qualities with hip hop
 Emo pop – fusion of emo and pop punk
 English folk music – folk music of England.
 Enka – a popular, modern adaptation of traditional Japanese music
 Epic Metal – a variety of heavy metal

Er-Ex
 Eremwu eu – work songs of the female bakers of the Garifuna people of west Africa
 Ethereal wave – atmospheric style of dark wave
 Ethiopian chant – liturgical chant practiced by the Ethiopian Orthodox Tewahedo Church.
 Eurobeat – antecedent to Italo disco
 Eurodance – European dance music and evolution of Euro disco that adapted elements of house and hi-NRG
 Euro disco – disco originating from Europe.
 Euro house – European house music, usually a house-based style of Eurodance or Euro disco
 Europop – pop music originating from Europe.
 Eurotrance – European trance music, usually a fusion of Eurodance with uplifting trance and/or hard trance.
 Exotica – a  style of easy listening that is meant to invoke the sounds of exotic locations (mostly Oceania) using non-Western instruments such as the Congo drum
 Experimental music – any music that breaches contemporary standards of music.
 Experimental pop – an experimental style of pop music which attempts to push elements of existing popular forms into new areas.
 Experimental rock – rock music that experiments with the basic elements of the genre.
 Expressionist music
 Extempo – a lyrically improvised style of calypso music.
 Extreme metal – any aggressive, non-commercial style of heavy metal music.

F
Fa-Fo – Fr – Fu

Fa-Fo
 Fado – Portuguese folk music, often touching on the themes of melancholia and working class struggles
 Falak music – Afghan, Tajik, and Pakistani religious folk music
 Fandango – Spanish music made to accompany the upbeat dance of the same name
 Farruca – a light style of flamenco
 Festejo – a style of Afro-Peruvian music
 Fife and drum blues – a fusion of Hill country blues and martial music that is performed typically with one lead fife player and a troop of drummers.
 Filk music – style of folk (sometimes expanding to other genres) with heavy science-fiction or fantasy themes
 Film score – any music written to act as a soundtrack to a motion picture
 Filmi – Indian film scores
 Filmi-ghazal – fusion of filmi and ghazal poetry
 Fingerstyle – the act of plucking guitar strings with the fingertips
 Flamenco – popular style of Spanish folk dance music developed in Andalusia by Romani-Spanish (or Gitanos), but latter expanding to the general Spanish populace
 Florida breaks – a regional style of breakbeat developed in Florida that is centered on rhythms usually found in hip-hop music.
 Folk jazz – a style of folk music (as in contemporary folk music) that contains elements of jazz, particularly its emphasis on musical solos.
 Folk metal – a fusion of folk music and heavy metal.
 Folk – music with usually a bouncy and western-like feel to it.
 Folk pop – fusion of folk and pop music
 Folk punk – fusion of folk and punk rock
 Folk rock – a fusion of folk music (as in contemporary folk music) and rock music; usually contains folk song structures and rock instrumentation.
 Folktronica – a fusion of folk music and electronic music.
 Forró – popular Brazilian folk dance music
 Foxtrot

Fr
 Freakbeat – a frantic, raw style of beat and British Invasion music
 Freak folk – experimental style of folk, often folk-rock
 Free improvisation – 1. completely uncontrolled musical improvisation; 2. an offshoot of free jazz.
 Free jazz – a style of jazz that takes the genre's usage of musical improvisation to the extreme, almost to the point of eliminating jazz's other elements. Related and originally synonymous with avant-garde jazz, free jazz is completely improvisational
 Free tekno – style of techno developed by anarchists
 French house – house music originating from France that usually tries to emulate the genre that house music sprang out of: disco.
 Frevo – Brazilian dance styles associated with the Brazilian Carnivale

Fu
 Fuji music – Nigerian folk music
 Full-on – style of psychedelic trance known for its rolling baselines and confrontational themes
 Funaná – Cape Verdean accordion-based dance music
 Funeral doom – incredibly slow style of doom metal, made to mimic funeral music
 Funeral march
 Funk – a popular music genre that combines blues (via rhythm and blues), jazz, and soul music and is known for its de-emphasis towards melodies and harmonies in favor of the bassline.
 Funk metal – a style of funk rock and a form of alternative metal that fuses funk with heavy metal music.
 Funk rock – a fusion of funk and rock music; usually contains rock guitar riffs and funk basslines.
 Funky house – fusion of funk and house music
 Furniture music – a calming, live style of background music
 Future bass – This genre stems from trap, juke and UK garage. it is focused on 808 drums and sawtooth synths
 Future garage – a style of UK garage known for its off-kilter rhythmic production.
 Future soul
 Futurepop – style of EDM known for its similarities to synthpop, EBM and uplifting trance, as well as its heavy sampling

Next sections
 Section G–M | Section N–R | Section S–Z

References